Trevor Carter (October 1930 – March 2008) was a leading British communist activist, educator, and black civil rights activist, most famous for co-founding the Caribbean Teachers Association and serving as the Head of Equal Opportunities for the Inner London Education Authority. Carter was the stage manager of the first British-Caribbean Carnival, held in St Pancras Town Hall, and later a Trustee of the Notting Hill Carnival Trust. His skills within the field of education led to the first Premier of British Guiana, Cheddi Jagan, personally inviting Carter to Guiana to perform educational work. Several historians of British socialist movements have described Carter as "one of the Communist Party of Great Britain's (CPGB) most important black members" from the mid-1950s until 1991. Carter was the cousin of fellow black civil rights leader and communist activist Claudia Jones, and the husband of EastEnders actress Corinne Skinner-Carter, all of them playing essential roles in establishing the second largest annual carnival in the world, London's Notting Hill Carnival. 

Carter was a lifelong communist activist, and a member of the Communist Party of Great Britain (CPGB) from his arrival to Britain in 1954 until the party was dissolved in 1991.

Early life 
Trevor Carter was born in Woodbrook, Port of Spain, in the British colony of Trinidad, on 9 October 1930, the eldest of 12 children belonging to housewife Elene Carter, and her husband, cabinet maker Clarence Carter. His views and political beliefs were heavily influenced by some of his teachers who were Marxists, and by his father who was a trade unionist, the combination of which made a strong impression on Carter. Sometime during his childhood, he met a girl called Corinne, whom he married later in life. At the age of 14, Carter left school and began working as a mess boy on a merchant ship, during which he travelled to New Orleans where he witnessed the brutality of segregation. His experiences with Jim Crow laws made him vow to never live in the United States. After working as a seaman and travelling through various parts of the United States, he decided to move to Britain to study architecture at Regent Street Polytechnic. In 1954 he arrived in London as a member of the Windrush generation.

Arrival in Britain and early activism 
Several days after arriving in Britain, Trevor Carter joined the Young Communist League (YCL), the youth branch of the Communist Party of Great Britain (CPGB), a party that he would also join. He remarked that joining the British communists caused him "feeling of elation", similar to what Paul Robeson had experienced visiting the Soviet Union and discovering there was no segregation. Later in life, he credited his time within the British communist movement for helping him to understand that the Mau Mau Uprising was an anti-colonial liberation struggle, and for making him more aware of Africa. Elaborating on his political alignment, he claimed that there was a lot of racism within local Labour Party branches and that this caused him and many other anti-racist activists to instead join the YCL and CPGB. Sometime during 1955, Carter lived in a house with fellow Caribbean communist activist, Billy Strachan, who Carter described as his mentor.

The CPGB was able to gain close contacts with Caribbean communist such as Carter through its support of the Caribbean Labour Congress (CLC), an organisation described by the Labour Party and TUC as a "communist front". The British branch of the CLC was founded in 1948 with the help of CPGB activists, who allowed the CLC to print their newspaper, Caribbean News, free of charge.

In November 1955 Trevor Carter's cousin, the communist activist and black civil rights leader Claudia Jones arrived in Southampton, England, where she was greeted by Carter and his wife Corinne (then fiancé). Jones, who was also born in Trinidad and once served on the National Committee of the Communist Party USA, was imprisoned for her communist beliefs and her support for Black African-American civil rights and was deported to Britain under the McCarran Act. Carter, along with many other veteran Caribbean communist activists, admired Claudia for her understanding of racial and class issues. She quickly became very close with the couple, with Corinne Skinner-Carter regularly doing Jone's hair, and the three of them often collaborating with Caribbean cultural projects. On New Year's Eve 1955, Trevor Carter married Corinne Skinner Carter at Christ Church, Hampstead.

In 1956, Carter was summoned by the British government to perform national service but did not want to take part in Britain's colonial wars, which were at the time happening in Malaya, Kenya, Ireland, Oman, and Cyprus. To help him avoid national service, leading British communist Palme Dutt arranged for Carter to instead travel to the Soviet Union and attend events in socialist countries. During his work for the CPGB and YCL, Carter travelled to Moscow, and also to Cuba where he met Fidel Castro and Daniel Ortega. After hearing that his wife, the actress Corinne Skinner-Carter, had been badly burned on a film set, he returned to Britain to be with her. After returning to Britain to live with his wife, the couple moved to Hampstead.

Role in the creation of Notting Hill Carnival 
In the aftermath of the 1959 racist murder of Kelso Cochrane and the Notting Hill race riots, Trevor Carter, Corinne Skinner-Carter, and Claudia Jones were among a committee who sought to create a carnival to bring the London Caribbean community together. Their plans came to fruition on the 30th January 1959, and Carter worked as the stage manager of the first British-Caribbean Carnival, held in St Pancras Town Hall. This event would be the precursor to the Notting Hill Carnival, which would become the second-largest annual carnival in the world. Carter supported the Notting Hill Carnival for the remainder of his life, and also served as a Trustee of the Notting Hill Carnival Trust.

Work in British Guiana 
Hearing about Carter's work in the field of anti-colonial activism, the first Premier of British Guiana and current chief minister of Guyana, Cheddi Jagan, personally invited him to come to his country to help perform educational work. Carter worked in Guiana from 1963 to 1966 as a school teacher, Carter worked closely with the People's Progressive Party, a political party founded by Jagan. However, during his time in Guiana, the political situation became unstable, and a combination of both police repression and violence perpetrated by the People's National Congress and their attempts to destabilise the country.

Educationalist career and later work 
Upon returning to Britain from Guyana, Carter enrolled at the College of North West London (then Kilburn Polytechnic) and began studying A-level Physiology, Sociology, and Economics. During the nights he worked for a Telephone exchange in Covent Garden. Completing his courses, he enrolled at the University of North London (then Polytechnic of North London) in 1968.

Sometime during the 1970s, Carter was involved in the campaign to free the Mangrove Nine, a group of black activists who were charged with inciting a riot, only to all be acquitted.

After graduation, Carter became a qualified British teacher and began working at Brooke House secondary school in Lower Clapton, Hackney, and later became the school's Head of the Social Studies department.  Alongside other black activists, Carter became one of the founding members of the Caribbean Teachers Association, which then led him to later become involved in the Rampton Report which found that the British educational system had been failing black students. He worked on another government educational reform white paper called the Swann Report, which he played a central role in creating as a researcher. For his work on the Swann Report, Carter was recommended to receive from the Queen the Member of the Order of the British Empire (MBE/OBE) by the educational authority, however, Carter rejected the award. He rejected the award for several reasons, citing that Britain was no longer an Empire, that he was a communist, and that the Prime Minister did not value his work.

He joined the Inner London Education Authority as a Senior Education Liaison Officer, before being made their Head of Equal Opportunities. He was also the chairman of the Hackney Community Relations Enterprise, and co-founder of both the Caribbean Teachers Organisation and the Black Theatre Co-operative. He also gave voluntary assistance to War on Want. He worked with Jean Coussins to co-create Shattering Illusions: West Indians in British Politics (1986).

After the Communist Party of Great Britain dissolved in 1991, he joined the Labour Party and ran as a council candidate for the Labour party Labour in Islington.

Trevor Carter died in early March 2008 at his home in Archway, London. His Memorial Service was held on 18 March 2008, at St Augustine's Church. His eulogy, titled A Life with Purpose, was delivered by Professor Gus John. Jeremy Corbyn, then an MP for Islington, was a great admirer of Trevor Carter, describing him as a “hope and inspiration to many who were suffering appalling racism and discrimination as newly arrived workers from the West Indies.”

See also 
 Dorothy Kuya
Charlie Hutchison
Claudia Jones
Len Johnson
Paul Robeson

References

1930 births
2008 deaths
British activists
British communists
Communist Party of Great Britain members
People from Port of Spain
Trinidad and Tobago emigrants to the United Kingdom

`